Lisa Nicole Piasecki, known professionally as Tory Lane, is an American fetish model, exotic dancer, pornographic actress, and pornographic film director. She was named among the top twenty pornographic actresses at the 2007 Adultcon and has won two AVN Awards. In 2017, she was inducted into the AVN Hall of Fame.

Early life and career
Lane was born in Schenectady, New York. She worked as a bartender at a club called The Elbo Room on Fort Lauderdale Beach. She also worked at a sex shop and as a stripper in local Florida strip clubs.

Lane started in the pornographic film industry after being scouted in Florida by Peter North, and she then flew out to California and signed with the then-new agency LA Direct Models. After signing with LA Direct Models, Lane's first scene in a pornographic film was with Ben English and Marco In May 2007, Lane signed a two-year contract with Sin City for both acting and directing. In 2006, Lane was a finalist on the second season of Playboy TV reality show Jenna's American Sex Star, but she lost the prize in the final round. She was inducted into the AVN Hall of Fame in 2017.

Personal life
Lane is a personal friend of Jennifer Ketcham and features in her 2012 memoir I Am Jennie. Ketcham stated that Lane used the money she made in the industry to provide for her sister, extended family, and self and described her as "one of the few responsible girls in the biz".

Awards

References

External links

 
 
 

Year of birth unknown
American female adult models
American pornographic film actresses
American pornographic film directors
Women pornographic film directors
Actresses from Fort Lauderdale, Florida
Pornographic film actors from Florida
American people of Polish descent
Living people
21st-century American women